Tommaso Tentoni (born 10 June 1997) is an Italian footballer who plays as a right back for  club Novara.

Club career

Atalanta 
Born in Ancona, Tentoni was a youth exponent of Atalanta. Here he made 23 appearances and scored 1 goal for their U-19 team.

Loan to Forlì 
On 1 July 2015, Tentoni was loaned to Serie D side Forlì on a 2-year loan deal. On 6 September, Tentoni made his Serie D debut and he scored his first goal for Forlì in the 58th minute of a 5–1 away win over Villafranca Veronese, he played the entire match. On 11 November he scored his second goal in the 9th minute of a 4–3 home win over Lentigione. On 20 December he scored his third goal in the 83rd minute of a 5–1 home win over Delta Porto Tolle. Tentoni ended his first season to Forlì with 30 appearances and 3 goals and he helped the team to reach the promotion in Serie C, and on 27 August 2016, Tentoni made his professional debut in Serie C in a 1–0 away defeat against Venezia, he was replaced by Gianluca Piccoli in the 43rd minute. On 24 September he played his first entire match in Serie C, a 1–0 away defeat against Sambenedettese. On 7 September he scored twice in a 2–2 away draw against Bassano Virtus. Tentoni ended his second season to Forlì with 27 appearances, 5 goals and 1 assist, but Forlì was relegated in Serie D after the play-out matches against Fano. In total Tentoni made 55 appearances, 8 goals and 1 assist.

Loan to Carrarese 
On 17 July 2017, Tentoni was loaned to Serie C club Carrarese on a season-long loan deal. On 27 August he made his Serie C debut for Carrarese and he also scored his first goal for the club in the 29th minute of a 1–0 away win over Cuneo, he played the entire match.  He became Carrarese's first-choice early in the season. From 27 August to 18 February, Tentoni played 25 consecutive entire match for Carrarese. Tentoni ended his season-long loan to Carrarese with 37 appearances, including 34 as a starter, scoring 1 goal and making 2 assists.

Loan to Alessandria 
On 20 July 2018, Tentoni was signed by Serie C side Alessandria on a season-long loan deal. On 29 July he made his debut for Alessandria in a 1–0 home defeat against Giana Erminio in the first round of Coppa Italia, he played the entire match. On 16 September he made his Serie C debut for the team in a 2–1 away win over Juventus U23, he played the entire match. On 23 December he scored his first goal for the team in the 75th minute of a 1–1 home draw against Pontedera. Tentoni ended his season-long loan to Alessandria with 17 appearances and 1 goal.

Imolese 
On 16 July 2019, Tentoni joined to Serie C club Imolese on free-transfer and he signed a 2-year contract. On 4 August he made his debut for Imolese and scored also his first goal for the club in the 51st minute of a match won 4–3 at penalties after a 3–3 draw  against Sambenedettese in the first round of Coppa Italia, he was replaced by Filippo Artioli in the 88th minute. On 25 August he made his league debut for Imolese in a 2–1 away defeat against Rimini, he was replaced by Abdoulaye Sall in the 91st minute. On 29 September he played his first entire match for the club, a 1–0 away defeat against Cesena.

Seregno 
On 14 August 2020 he moved to Seregno in Serie D.

Novara 
For the 2021-22 season, he joined to Novara.

Career statistics

Club

References

External links
 

1997 births
Living people
Sportspeople from Ancona
Footballers from Marche
Italian footballers
Association football defenders
Serie C players
Serie D players
Atalanta B.C. players
Forlì F.C. players
Carrarese Calcio players
U.S. Alessandria Calcio 1912 players
Imolese Calcio 1919 players
U.S. 1913 Seregno Calcio players
Novara F.C. players